The Ärmighorn (also spelled Ärmighore) is a mountain of the Bernese Alps, located east of Kandergrund in the Bernese Oberland. It lies north of the Dündenhorn, on the range between the Kandertal and the Kiental.

References

External links
 Ärmighorn on Hikr

Mountains of the Alps
Bernese Alps
Mountains of Switzerland
Mountains of the canton of Bern
Two-thousanders of Switzerland